Joseph Paneth (6 October 1857 – 4 January 1890) was an Austrian physiologist born in Vienna. Paneth is remembered for his description of "Paneth cells", which are cells that provide host defense against microbes in the mucosa of the small intestine.

He studied at the Universities of Heidelberg and Vienna, where he worked with physiologist Ernst Wilhelm von Brücke (1819–1892). After a short stay at the University of Breslau, he returned to Vienna, where in 1886 he became a lecturer at the university. In 1883 and 1884 he worked at the zoological station at Villefranche, near Nice.

He was a good friend of psychologist Sigmund Freud, who made a posthumous reference of Paneth in The Interpretation of Dreams. Paneth is also remembered for his correspondence with philosopher Friedrich Nietzsche.

He was the father of chemist Friedrich Paneth (1887–1958).

Notes

References 
 Austrian Short biography

Further reading 
 Joseph Paneth über seine Begegnung mit Nietzsche in der Zarathustra-Zeit. (Joseph Paneth about his encounter with Nietzsche in Zarathustra period.) Richard Frank Krumel. In: Nietzsche Studien. Internationales Handbuch für die Nietzsche-Forschung, Bd. 17 (1988), pp. 478–495.

19th-century Austrian people
Austrian physiologists
Academic staff of the University of Vienna
Austrian Jews
Scientists from Vienna
1857 births
1890 deaths